Agniopsis flavovittatus is a species of beetle in the family Cerambycidae, and the only species in the genus Agniopsis. It was described by Breuning in 1936.

References

Lamiini
Beetles described in 1936